Serena and Venus Williams defeated Virginia Ruano Pascual and Paola Suárez in the final, 6–2, 7–5 to win the ladies' doubles tennis title at the 2002 Wimbledon Championships. It was their second Wimbledon doubles title together and sixth major title together overall.

Lisa Raymond and Rennae Stubbs were the defending champions, but lost in the quarterfinals to Anna Kournikova and Chanda Rubin.

Seeds

  Lisa Raymond /  Rennae Stubbs (quarterfinals)
  Virginia Ruano Pascual /  Paola Suárez (final)
  Serena Williams /  Venus Williams (champions)
  Cara Black /  Elena Likhovtseva (semifinals)
  Kimberly Po-Messerli /  Nathalie Tauziat (quarterfinals)
  Sandrine Testud /  Roberta Vinci (third round)
  Nicole Arendt /  Liezel Huber (second round)
  Elena Dementieva /  Janette Husárová (first round)
  Rika Fujiwara /  Ai Sugiyama (third round)
  Tina Križan /  Katarina Srebotnik (quarterfinals)
  Janet Lee /  Wynne Prakusya (third round)
  Silvia Farina Elia /  Barbara Schett (third round)
  Els Callens /  Meghann Shaughnessy (third round)
  Dája Bedáňová /  Elena Bovina (first round)
  Amanda Coetzer /  Lori McNeil (second round)
  Jennifer Capriati /  Daniela Hantuchová (second round)

Qualifying

Draw

Finals

Top half

Section 1

Section 2

Bottom half

Section 3

Section 4

References

External links

2002 Wimbledon Championships on WTAtennis.com
2002 Wimbledon Championships – Women's draws and results at the International Tennis Federation

Women's Doubles
Wimbledon Championship by year – Women's doubles